The second season of the Pakistani music television series Coke Studio commenced airing on 14 June 2009 and ended on 14 August 2009 on Independence Day.
The second series of Coke Studio included notable differences from the first series, including the fact that the live audiences were excluded. The series also ran for longer, this time there were five episodes in total and in each episode there were five or more performances by the featuring artists. Rohail Hyatt returned as the executive producer along with Umber Hyatt as the producer of the show.

Artists 
The second season featured Ali Zafar and Strings performing for the second time at Coke Studio as they were also part of the first season.

Musicians 
Season 2 saw an increase in the number of musicians in the house band.

Episodes
The second season began on 14 June 2009 and ended on the Independence Day of Pakistan, 14 August. Each episode was given an individual title and the episode titles were: Individuality, Harmony, Equality, Spirit and Unity respectively.

Coke Studio Special

Coke Studio Special is part of the Coke Studio video web blog series which included special features such as unreleased performances from the second season of the show. The first video blog was released on 15 January 2010 and the last video blog was released on 16 May 2010, on the YouTube channel of the show.

References

External links
 

Season02
2009 Pakistani television seasons